Trio and Quintet is an album by jazz pianist Elmo Hope which compiles sessions recorded in 1953, originally released as a 10" LP titled Elmo Hope Trio, and 1954, originally released as a 10" LP titled Elmo Hope Quintet, Volume 2, for the Blue Note label along with a session from 1957 originally released on Pacific Jazz as part of a 1962 LP release shared with a Jazz Messengers reissue.

Reception

The Allmusic review by Stephen Cook stated "Of the collections of Elmo Hope's '50s recordings, Trio and Quintet is the one to get. It includes his prime Blue Note sessions and features a stellar cast of hard bop musicians... This Blue Note release is great not only for its cross-section of Hope compositions, but also for the many fertile ideas they've inspired in top-drawer soloists".

Track listing
All compositions by Elmo Hope except as indicated
 "It's a Lovely Day Today" (Irving Berlin) - 2:47     
 "Mo Is On" - 2:50     
 "Sweet and Lovely" (Gus Arnheim, Jules LeMare, Harry Tobias) - 2:59     
 "Happy Hour" - 2:52     
 "Hot Sauce" - 3:53     
 "Stars Over Marrakech" - 3:06     
 "Freffie" - 3:05     
 "Carvin' the Rock" (Hope, Sonny Rollins) - 2:55     
 "I Remember You" (Victor Schertzinger, Johnny Mercer, Mark Fisher) - 2:46     
 "Mo Is On" [alternate take] - 2:51     
 "Crazy" - 4:17     
 "Abdullah" - 3:48     
 "Chips" - 3:35     
 "Later for You" - 4:01     
 "Low Tide" - 4:12     
 "Maybe So" - 4:24     
 "Crazy" [alternate take]  - 4:23     
 "So Nice" - 6:08     
 "St. Elmo's Fire" - 5:56     
 "Vaun Ex" - 4:45  
Recorded at Van Gelder Studion in Hackensack, New Jersey on June 18, 1953 (tracks 1-10) and May 9, 1954 (tracks 11-17) and in Los Angeles on October 31, 1957 (tracks 18-20)

Personnel 
Elmo Hope - piano
Charles Freeman Lee (tracks 11-17), Stu Williamson (tracks 18-20) - trumpet 
Frank Foster (tracks 11-17) Harold Land (tracks 18-20) - tenor saxophone 
Percy Heath (tracks 1-17), Leroy Vinnegar (tracks 18-20) - bass
Art Blakey (tracks 11-17), Philly Joe Jones (tracks 1-10), Frank Butler (tracks 18-20) - drums

References 

1989 albums
Albums produced by Alfred Lion
Albums recorded at Van Gelder Studio
Blue Note Records albums
Elmo Hope albums